Marek Gołąb (7 May 1940 in Zakliczyn – 6 October 2017 in Wrocław) was a Polish weightlifter who competed in the 1968 Summer Olympics at which he won a bronze medal in the middle-heavyweight division.

References

1940 births
2017 deaths
Polish male weightlifters
Olympic weightlifters of Poland
Weightlifters at the 1968 Summer Olympics
Olympic bronze medalists for Poland
Olympic medalists in weightlifting
People from Tarnów County
Sportspeople from Lesser Poland Voivodeship
Medalists at the 1968 Summer Olympics
20th-century Polish people
21st-century Polish people